Van Auken or Vanauken may refer to:

People
Bill Van Auken, a presidential candidate in the U.S. election of 2004
Daniel Myers Van Auken, a Democratic member of the U.S. House of Representatives from Pennsylvania
Sheldon Vanauken, an American author

Places
Van Auken Creek, a tributary of the Lackawaxen River in Pennsylvania

See also
Auken, a surname